Miriam Nagl (born 22 January 1981) is a Brazilian professional golfer who currently plays on the Ladies European Tour.

Nagl was born in Curitiba, Brazil. Her family moved to Germany when she was eight years old and she represented Germany until 2015.

Nagl played college golf at Arizona State University for one year, then turned professional in 2001. She played on the Futures Tour in 2002, winning twice. She played on the LPGA Tour from 2003 to 2008 and on the Ladies European Tour from 2005 to 2009. After returning to the Futures Tour for 2010 and 2011, she has played on the Ladies European Tour since 2012.

In 2016, she won the Moss Vale Ladies Classic on the ALPG Tour.

Nagl took part in the 2016 Summer Olympics in her native country.

Professional wins

ALPG Tour wins
2016 Moss Vale Ladies Classic

Futures Tour
2002 Grand Rapids Futures Classic, Capital Region Futures Classic

Team appearances
Amateur
 European Ladies' Team Championship (representing Germany): 1999
Espirito Santo Trophy (representing Germany): 1998, 2000

References

External links

Brazilian female golfers
German female golfers
Arizona State Sun Devils women's golfers
LPGA Tour golfers
Ladies European Tour golfers
Olympic golfers of Brazil
Golfers at the 2016 Summer Olympics
Sportspeople from Curitiba
Sportspeople from Berlin
1981 births
Living people